Massimo Lodolo (born 12 November 1959) is an Italian actor and voice actor.

Biography
Born in Rome, Lodolo is of Friulian descent on his father's side of the family. He is the nephew of director and screenwriter Sandro Lodolo (1929-2009). He started out his career as a child starring in commercials directed by his uncle and he worked in the radio industry as a presenter during his teen years. As an actor, he starred in plays written by Oscar Wilde and Carlo Goldoni and even enjoyed success as a film and television actor. Among his most popular filmography includes Flight of the Innocent (1992).

Lodolo is also renowned as a voice actor and dubber. He is typically known for dubbing malevolent, selfish, greedy and arrogant characters. He is best known for voicing Lucius Malfoy (portrayed by Jason Issacs) in the Italian dub of the Harry Potter film franchise as well as Gopher in the Italian dub of the Winnie the Pooh franchise. Among the actors he is known for dubbing includes Vincent Cassel, Tim Roth, Andy García, Gary Oldman and Alfred Molina.

Filmography

Cinema
Stasera in quel palazzo (1991)
Ask for the Moon (1991)
Blu notte (1992)Flight of the Innocent (1992)Alto rischio (1993)Bits and Pieces (1996)Ilona Arrives with the Rain (1996)Lucky and Zorba (1998) - Voice

Dubbing roles
Animation
Sarousch in The Hunchback of Notre Dame IIGopher in The Many Adventures of Winnie the PoohGopher in Pooh's Heffalump Halloween MovieLord Shen in Kung Fu Panda 2Moriarty in Sherlock GnomesFrederick Sackville-Bagg in The Little Vampire 3DColonel Cutter in AntzYivo in Futurama: The Beast with a Billion BacksBugs Bunny in Daffy Duck's QuackbustersFrankie Lino in Shark TaleProfessor Mac Krill in Help! I'm a FishGriffin in Quest for CamelotThug Guard in The Great Mouse DetectiveBeaver in Lady and the Tramp (1997 redub)
Emperor Maltazard in Arthur and the InvisiblesEmperor Maltazard in Arthur and the Revenge of MaltazardEmperor Maltazard in Arthur 3: The War of the Two WorldsLloyd Christmas in Dumb and DumberOptimus Prime in Transformers: Robots in DisguiseLive action
Lucius Malfoy in Harry Potter and the Chamber of SecretsLucius Malfoy in Harry Potter and the Goblet of FireLucius Malfoy in Harry Potter and the Order of the PhoenixLucius Malfoy in Harry Potter and the Half-Blood PrinceLucius Malfoy in Harry Potter and the Deathly Hallows – Part 1Lucius Malfoy in Harry Potter and the Deathly Hallows – Part 2Marcus in IrréversibleMike Blueberry in BlueberryBrisseau in Secret AgentsJoseph in SheitanJacques Mesrine in MesrineFranck in TranceGregori in PartisanRingo "Pumpkin" in Pulp FictionDrexl Spivey in True RomanceEgor Korshunov in Air Force OneRussell Casse in Independence DayBishop Aringarosa in The Da Vinci CodeJohn Pearce in RestorationTerry Benedict in Ocean's ElevenTerry Benedict in Ocean's TwelveTerry Benedict in Ocean's ThirteenDominic Badguy in Muppets Most WantedBarton Fink in Barton FinkNathaniel Shepherd in The Space Between UsJack Baldwin in End GameVincent van Gogh in Vincent & TheoCharley Pearl in The Marrying ManGuildenstern in Rosencrantz & Guildenstern Are DeadArchie in BrokenTed in Four RoomsDetective Bryer in ArbitrageRoy in The LiabilityGeorge Wallace in SelmaCoach Jared in 1 Mile to YouEmilio Lopez in Mr. DeedsFatoush "Phantom" Hakbarah in You Don't Mess with the ZohanUla in 50 First DatesColonel J. Wesley McCullough in War for the Planet of the ApesJohn Shooter in Secret WindowRat King in The Nutcracker in 3DMorty in ClickEnrico Pollini in Rat RaceAmedeo Modigliani in ModiglianiJack Begosian in A Dark TruthEnrique Gorostieta in For Greater GloryAndrew Palma in GeostormOtto Octavius / Doctor Octopus in Spider-Man 2Davide Rieti in The Moon and the StarsJack Mellor in An EducationFrank Burton in AbductionDoc in SwelterCarnegie in The Book of EliReynolds Woodcock in Phantom ThreadCollector in Guardians of the Galaxy, Avengers: Infinity War''

References

External links

 
 
 
 

1959 births
Living people
Male actors from Rome
Italian male voice actors
Italian male film actors
Italian male television actors
Italian male stage actors
Italian male radio actors
Italian voice directors
20th-century Italian male actors
21st-century Italian male actors
People of Friulian descent
People of Lazian descent